On 8 May 2017, two bombs exploded in Peshawar while the third one was defused by Bomb Disposal Squad. Three officials of Counter Terrorism Department (CTD) were injured. Beside CTD officials, a passerby was also injured. The injured were moved to Lady Reading Hospital.

Bombings 
At around 4:50 am, an IED went off outside a girls primary school in Urmar area on Shamshato Road. The school gate was damaged as the bomb detonated. According to police, two IEDs were found installed outside the school, out of which one exploded while the other was defused by the Bomb Disposal Squad. The diffused bomb contained 2–2.25 kg of material. The CTD team was on their way back after inspecting the site when their vehicle was detonated near Khotko Bridge. At the spot, three officials were injured who were identified as Akbar Ali, Israr and Nizar. A passerby named Wali-ur-Rahman was also injured as the bomb exploded.

References 

School bombings
History of Peshawar
Terrorist incidents in Pakistan in 2017
Terrorist incidents in Peshawar
May 2017 crimes in Asia